Atlantic City Air National Guard Base is an Air National Guard base located at Atlantic City International Airport in New Jersey. The base is home New Jersey Air National Guard's 177th Fighter Wing, operating F-16C Fighting Falcon.

Role and operations 
Established in 1958 at Atlantic City International Airport , Atlantic City Air National Guard Base is home to the 177th Fighter Wing (177 FW), an Air Combat Command (ACC)-gained unit of the New Jersey Air National Guard, operating the F-16C/D Fighting Falcon. Since October 1998, the wing has had an active involvement in Operation Noble Eagle, Operation Southern Watch, Operation Northern Watch, Operation Enduring Freedom and Operation Iraqi Freedom.

The 177th Fighter Wing has dual federal (USAF augmentation) and state (support to New Jersey) missions. It carries out Homeland Security air defense missions under the control of the Eastern Air Defense Sector, part of the North American Aerospace Defense Command for peacetime air sovereignty, air defense, and airborne counter-drug operations.

References

External links 
177th Fighter Wing

Installations of the United States Air National Guard
Egg Harbor Township, New Jersey
Galloway Township, New Jersey
Hamilton Township, Atlantic County, New Jersey
1958 establishments in New Jersey